John Escreet  (born 18 August 1984) is an English jazz pianist.

Biography
Escreet moved to New York in 2006. In 2008 he graduated from the Master’s Program at Manhattan School of Music, where he studied piano with Kenny Barron and Jason Moran.

In September 2008 he released his debut album Consequences featuring David Binney (alto saxophone), Ambrose Akinmusire (trumpet), Matt Brewer (double bass) and Tyshawn Sorey (drums). He also collaborated with artists including Wayne Krantz, Ari Hoenig, Adam Rogers, Chris Potter and Seamus Blake.

He has also worked as a sideman with saxophonist David Binney and drummer Antonio Sanchez.

Discography

As leader

As sideman

References

External links
 Official site

1984 births
Living people
People from Doncaster
21st-century pianists
English jazz pianists
Manhattan School of Music alumni
Criss Cross Jazz artists
Posi-Tone Records artists
Whirlwind Recordings artists
Sunnyside Records artists